Belsize is a ward in the London Borough of Camden, in the United Kingdom.  The ward covers most of Belsize Park, between Haverstock Hill, Swiss Cottage, and Primrose Hill. 

The ward has existed since the creation of the borough on 1 April 1965 and was first used in the 1964 elections. The ward was redrawn in May 1978, May 2002, and May 2022. From 2010, the ward was in the Hampstead and Kilburn constituency, having previously been in Hampstead and Highgate from 1983 until 2010, and Hampstead prior to 1983. In 2018, the ward had an electorate of 8,999. The Boundary Commission projects the electorate to rise to 9,097 by 2025.

The ward currently returns three councillors to Camden Council, with an election every four years. At the last election in May 2022, all three candidates from the Liberal Democrats were elected to represent the ward.

History

The ward underwent boundary changes for the 2022 election. A significant portion of the ward was transferred to the newly created Primrose Hill ward, and significant portions of the existing Hampstead Town and Frognal and Fitzjohns wards were transferred to Belsize.

At the 2022 election, leader of the Conservative group on Camden London Borough Council Oliver Cooper stood as a candidate in Belsize, having previously represented Hampstead Town. Hampstead Town had been a safe Conservative ward, while Belsize had been marginal between the Conservatives and the Liberal Democrats. Leader of the Liberal Democrat group Luisa Porritt, who represented Belsize, stood down at the 2022 election, citing work commitments, while the Camden New Journal suggested that the new ward boundaries would favour the Conservatives.

Councillors
Notable former councillors include Opposition Leaders Claire-Louise Leyland (2010–18), Piers Wauchope (2002–06), Judith Barnes (1986–98), and Tony Kerpel (1978–86); MEP Luisa Porritt (2018–22); future Council Leader Richard Arthur (1974–78); and former Leader Martin Morton (1976–78).

1978–2022 
Three councillors have represented Belsize ward since 1978. Currently, all three councillors from the Liberal Democrats represent the ward.

1964–1978 
Four councillors represented Belsize ward, from its creation in 1964, until 1978.

Election results 
The last election was held in May 2022. Candidates seeking re-election are marked with an asterisk (*). Councillors seeking re-election for a different ward are marked with a cross (†).

2002–2018

2022 election

2018 election

2014 election

2010 election

2009 by-election 

The by-election was called following the resignation of Cllr Christopher J. Basson.

2006 election

2002 election

1978–2002 
The last election on 7 May 1998 was held under the original ward boundaries.

1998 election

1994 election

1990 election

1986 election

1982 election

1980 by-election 

The by-election was called following the resignation of Cllr Anthony Beaton.

1978 election

Pre 1978 
Before 1978, under different boundaries, the ward was represented by four councillors.

1976 by-election

The by-election was called following the resignation of Cllr Richard Arthur.

1974 election

1971 election

1968 election

1964 election

References

Wards of the London Borough of Camden
1965 establishments in England
Belsize Park